Khorol is a city in Poltava Oblast, Ukraine. It is the administrative center of Khorol Raion. Population: 

Notable natives of Khorol include Ben-Zion Dinur and Aryeh Dvoretzky.

Name 
The town is named after the Khorol River upon which it is situated.

Gallery

References 

Cities in Poltava Oblast
Khorolsky Uyezd
Cities of district significance in Ukraine